The .221 Remington Fireball, often simply referred to as .221 Fireball, is a centerfire cartridge created by Remington Arms Company in 1963 as a special round for use in their experimental single-shot bolt-action pistol, the XP-100. A shortened version of the .222 Remington, it is popular as a varmint and small predator round while also finding use among target shooters. It has application as both a pistol round and as a rifle round.

History 
In the early 1960s Remington was working on an experimental bolt-action pistol based on their Model 600 action. The goal was a highly accurate pistol that would be well suited for competition. After working with the .222 Remington they determined that it contained more powder capacity than was necessary to work efficiently in the shorter barrels of pistols. As a result, Remington decided to develop a shorter version of the .222 Remington cartridge, optimized for use in the XP-100.

While production of XP-100 pistols chambered in .221 Fireball was eventually canceled after 1985, Thompson Center Arms produced various single-shot pistols chambered for the .221 Fireball as part of their Contender and Encore models. Rifles chambered for the .221 Fireball include the Remington 700 and the Ceska zbrojovka CZ 527.

Performance 
Despite its smaller size, the .221 Fireball is capable of velocities nearly equal to that of the .222 Remington largely due to its higher SAAMI pressure. The maximum SAAMI pressure level for the .221 Fireball is 52,000 C.U.P. as compared to 46,000 C.U.P. for the .222 Remington. The purpose of the increased pressure was to allow it to perform more effectively in the shorter barrel of the XP-100.

The .221 Fireball produces the highest velocity of any commercial pistol cartridge.

Offshoots 
The .221 Fireball has been used by wildcatters to create a small efficient .17 caliber cartridge. The most common is the .17 Mach IV which is essentially the .221 necked down to the smaller caliber. This cartridge is reported to have a very flat trajectory and to be relatively quiet with low recoil. It has been so popular as a wildcat that in 2007 Remington legitimized it by introducing their own version only slightly different from the Mach IV and calling it the .17 Remington Fireball.  A .20 caliber version is also gaining popularity called the .20 VarTarg (VT), "vartarg" being the combination of the words "varmint" and "target". The .221 Fireball has also been used as the base for the .300 Whisper, sometimes referred to as the .300/.221 or .300 Fireball. It is also the basis for other cartridges in J.D. Jones' Whisper family including the 6 mm Whisper, which has been adopted by Knight's Armament Corporation for their new Knight's Armament Company PDW as the 6×35mm PDW.

Gallery

See also 
 .22 Spitfire, a similar .22 caliber centerfire cartridge
 5 mm caliber
 List of rifle cartridges
 Table of handgun and rifle cartridges

References 

221 Remington Fireball
Remington Arms cartridges